Zoltan I. Kertesz (September 2, 1903 – August 1968) was a Hungarian-born, American food scientist who was involved in the early development of food microbiology and food chemistry. He was also an active member of the Institute of Food Technologists (IFT).

Career
Kertesz was born in Hungary, but emigrated to the United States where he went to work for the New York State Agricultural Experiment Station (NYSAES), part of Cornell University. It was there he would work on food microbiology and food chemistry. This included improving the grading and quality of canned peas, which was featured in a 1935 Time magazine article.

IFT involvement
An active member of IFT, Kertesz would serve as Editor-In-Chief of Food Technology magazine from July 1950 to July 1952 and of Food Research after IFT purchased the scientific journal from Garand Press in 1951. He would receive the IFT International Award in 1967.

Other professional involvement
Kertesz was also a member of the American Chemical Society.

Selected articles

References
Mermelstein, N.H. and F.R. Katz. "Advancing Food Science and Technology for Fifty Years." Food Technology. January 1997: pp. 8–11.

External links

List of IFT past award winners

20th-century American chemists
American food scientists
Cornell University faculty
Hungarian food scientists
1903 births
1968 deaths
Hungarian emigrants to the United States